Kottawa Ananda Maha Vidyalaya founded on 1 April 1902 in Kottawa.[1] A Buddhist school in Sri Lanka, provides primary and secondary education.

References 

Schools in Colombo District